Robert Roe Skidmore (born October 30, 1945) is an American former professional baseball player and one of the few players in Major League Baseball history with a perfect career batting average of 1.000.

An outfielder and first baseman, he had a ten-year, 1,289-game career (1966–1975) in minor league baseball, but made only one Major League appearance as a pinch hitter for the  Chicago Cubs.

Skidmore had split the 1970 season between the Cubs' two top farm clubs, the San Antonio Missions and the Tacoma Cubs, before his late-season trial in the Majors.  On September 17, 1970, during a 9–2 loss to the St. Louis Cardinals at Wrigley Field, he pinch hit for Joe Decker in the seventh inning and singled off Cardinal left-hander Jerry Reuss. He was then retired on a force out. It was Skidmore's only Major League at bat. He was traded along with Dave Lemonds and Pat Jacquez by the Cubs to the Chicago White Sox for Ossie Blanco and José Ortiz on November 30, 1970.

Roe attended Eisenhower High School in Decatur, Illinois.

References

Further reading
SABR BioProject

External links
, or Retrosheet, or  Pelota Binaria (Venezuelan Winter League)

1945 births
Living people
Arizona Instructional League Cubs players
Arizona Instructional League Giants players
Baseball players from Illinois
Cardenales de Lara players
American expatriate baseball players in Venezuela
Chicago Cubs players
Decatur Commodores players
Denver Bears players
Indianapolis Indians players
Iowa Oaks players
Millikin Big Blue baseball players
Pawtucket Red Sox players
San Antonio Missions players
Sportspeople from Decatur, Illinois
Tacoma Cubs players
Tucson Toros players
Tulsa Oilers (baseball) players
West Palm Beach Braves players
Yakima Braves players